Francisco Codera y Zaidín (Huesca, Spain, 23 June 1836 – 6 November 1917) was a Spanish historian, philologist and Arabist scholar. Among his students, known in the academic field as the Beni Codera,  were Arabists Rafael Altamira and José Deleito.

Life
Codera Zaidín was a Professor of Greek, Hebrew and Arabic respectively in Granada, Zaragoza and the Central University,.  As the principal student of Pascual Gayangos, he was an outstanding Arabist and succeeded him to the chair of Arabic at the Central University. He was appointed a permanent member of the Real Academia de la Historia on 20 April 1879. He was a language academic at the Royal Spanish Academy from 1910.

Works
Rigorously positivist, his works generally focus on historiographic sources of Arab origin (Estudios de historia arábigo-española, Decadencia y Desaparición de los Almorávides en España, 1899, reissued with an important introductory study by María Jesús Viguera Molins in 2004). His works include Tratado de numismática arabigoespañola ('Treaty of Arabo-Spanish Numismatics'), (1879); Estudios críticos de Historia árabe española ('Critical Studies of Spanish Arab History') (1917, 2 vols.) and above all, his monumental Biblioteca arabigohispana ('Arab-Hispanic Library') (1882–1895, 10 vols.). He also contributed to scholarship in Aragonese phonetics and promoted Arabic studies in Spain. He retired to his native town of Fonz, in the province of Huesca, to devote himself to his scholarly studies and the writing of treaties on agriculture. His students include Julián Ribera. His archive is conserved at the "Biblioteca de la Universidad Nacional de Educación a Distancia" (UNED).

See also
Encyclopædia Britannica Online

References

Bibliography

External links

Biobibliography at the GEA

1836 births
1917 deaths
19th-century Spanish historians
20th-century Spanish historians
19th-century philologists
20th-century philologists
19th-century linguists
20th-century linguists
Members of the Royal Spanish Academy
Spanish Arabists
Spanish orientalists